Bachelor of Sowa Rigpa Medicine and Surgery (BSRMS) (India) is an education pursued after 10+2 and clearing the National Eligibility cum Entrance Test (NEET) conducted by National Commission for Indian System of Medicine for a medical and surgical career in Sowa Rigpa Medicine. University Grants Commission in India has granted recognition to the bachelor degree program in Sowa Rigpa Medicine and Surgery (BSRMS) with minimum of five years duration making it open for any university or institution to offer the course after meeting the pre-requisites.

Background 

Sowa Rigpa Medicine and Surgery (BSRMS) is a traditional and indigenous Tibetan system with combination of Ayurveda, Chinese and Greek medicines. The medicine which is traditional and popular has been granted recognition by University Grants Commission.

Eligiblity 

Bachelor of Sowa Rigpa Medicine and Surgery (BSRMS) in India can be pursued by anyone who has the following qualifications:

 Is a pass out of class 12th Board exams having subjects biology, physics and chemistry with 50 percent aggregate from a recognised university or Institution, and
 Is qualified by National Eligibility cum Entrance Test conducted by National Commission for Indian System of Medicine.

Curriculum 

Bachelor of Sowa Rigpa Medicine and Surgery is designed as minimum five years degree and has the following curriculum:

 Medicine discourse procedure
 Dynamic equilibrium of mind and body
 Healthy and diseased body disequilibriums
 Disorders diagnosis with symptoms
 Various methods of therapy
 Disorders causes
 Diseases cause
 Causes of diseases in body
 Diseases symptoms and the disorders classification
 Modern Biology with an emphasis on cells and tissues
 Organisation of body
 Body systems and homeostasis
 Integration of body parts and its regulation
 Disease and disorder reproduction, heredity and development.

Institutions 

Bachelor of Sowa Rigpa Medicine and Surgery (BSRMS) is offered as a six-year course named ‘Menpa Kachupa in below institutions:

  Central Institute of Buddhist Studies (Leh).
  Tibetan Medical and Astrological Institute by Dalai Lama (Dharamshala)
  Central University for Tibetan Studies (Uttar Pradesh), and
  Chagpori Medical Institute (Darjeeling).

Career 

Bachelor of Sowa Rigpa Medicine and Surgery (BSRMS) can start their own practice after completion of their education and currently around 1000 practitioners reside near Himalayas with main base around Ladakh and Dharmashala as per Government of India records. They are also situated in the states of Sikkim, Arunachal, Pradesh, and West Bengal (Darjeeling).

See also 

 Ayurveda
 Education in India

References 

Sowa Rigpa Medicine and Surgery Bachelor of
Tibetan medicine
Academic degrees of India
Medical degrees
Medical education in India